Baharul Islam is an Indian theater actor. An alumnus of the National School of Drama, which he had joined in 1987 Baharul has acted in more than 80 plays, designed and directed 30 plays for his theater troupe Seagull. He is one of the busiest theatre artists in Assam. He is also a film actor who works in Assamese and Hindi films.

Personal life 
Baharul Islam is married to Bhagirathi Bai Kadam also an alumnus of National School of Drama along with him. He has two daughters.

Career 
He started his career with theater in Assam and soon rose into prominence in India and abroad. In 1992-93 joined "TARA ART" of London as an actor for the production of the play Heer Ranjha. The play rehearsed in London and thereafter extensively toured UK and Japan performing many shows. Baharul learnt theater music from B V Karanth and Bhaskar Chandervakar respectively. His first movie was a Aasene Kunuba Hiyat and latest was Rodor Sithi.

He has directed and played in almost 80 Assamese plays and one among them is Jatra. Also designed and directed almost 30 plays for SEAGULL- his own theater troupe. He has four years experience in commercial mobile Theatre (Bhrayamaman) in Assam as an actor. Performed almost 1200 shows with 16 plays.

He also wrote and Published 4 books.

 Akanto Monere
 Simar Sipare
 Beyond the Obvious
 Khiriki Khuliyei

All books have been published by Seagull Theatre Publication wing.

 KISU KATHA KISU NATAK -a collection of his 6 plays and its production processes (2012) has been published by Publication Board of Assam, Govt of Assam.

Award and recognition 
He received Manohar Singh Award 2005 instituted by the National School of Drama  approved by Ministry of Culture, Govt of India for path-breaking work in theater.

  Sanskriti Samman from Eka ebong koekjon publication, Guwahati,
  Natyaprobor Award from Sharadakanta Bordoloi smriti committee, Nowgaon in 2011.
  Bishnu Basu Smriti Samman by Bratyajon theatre, Kolkata in 2012.
  Badal SIrcar Rang Ratan Award 2015 from FACT Rang Mahoul Begusarai, Bihar.
  Harishankar Parsai Rashtriya Rang Samman 2016 by Vibechana Rang Mandal, Jabbalpur, MP
  Habib Tanvir Ras Rang Samman 2016 from Ras Kala Manch ROHTAK
 Natyaratna Ugra Mena Award 2017 from Ankuran Assam
 Natasurya Phani Sharma National Award 2017 from National Performing Art Association of India.

Bibliography 
He has so far acted in more than fifty plays and designed and directed many plays.

Acting 
Before  joining National School of Drama in 1987.

 Panimolar bia directed by Khirod Choudhury
 Opokendrik directed by Karuna Deka
 Ghorapaak by Karuna Deka
 Pragya by Karuna Deka
 Infra Radio scope by Karuna Deka
 Ankur by Amulya kakati
 Arya by jayanta Kumar Das
 Morubhumi by Karuna Deka
 Mamore dhora toruwal by dulal Roy
 Holi by Nayan Prasad
 Ulanga Roja by Abdul Majid
 Dhoraloi jidina namibo horog by Pulakesh Chetia
 Geleleo  by Bipin das
 A solo Swadhin by khirod Choudhury
 Patharughat  by Debesh Sarma
 Maharaja By Sanjeev Hazarika
 Pagala phatek by Abdul Majid
 Peperar prem by Subheswar Das

During National School of drama (1987-1990)

 Paanch choronka vesh by Jaydev Hattangadi
 The Seagull by Ram Gopal Bajaj
 The Untouchable by Cristine Landon Smith
 Sohrab Rustom by D R Ankur
 Father by Prasanna
 Chankya vishnugupta by Satyadev Dube
 khisiyani Billi by Barry John
 Twelve night by Fritz Bennewitz
 Nal damayanti by B V Karanth
 comred ka coat by Sanjay Upadhaya
 Nayak khalnayak vidushak Yogesh Pant
 Bhaloo by Naresh Chander Lal
 Miss Julie by Limbajee Bhiwajee
 Terekuttu

After NSD 1990 to 2019:

 Abhimonnyu by baharul islam
 Guwahati Guwahati by baharul islam
 Gadha Nritya by Bhagirathi Bai Kadam
 Jatra by baharul islam
 Nibaran bhattacharya by baharul islam
 Agnigarh by Anup Hazarika
 Five tons of love by baharul islam
 Hansini by baharul islam
 Akash by baharul islam
 Swabhav by baharul islam
 Ram shyam jadu by baharul islam
 Mechbath  by Bhagirathi Bai Kadam
 Julius Caesar  by Bhagirathi Bai Kadam
 Hattamelar hipare by Baharul islam
 Parashuram by Parag Sarma
 Court Marshal by baharul islam
 Madhyabartini  by baharul islam
 The Green Serpent by baharul islam
 Saraighat by baharul islam
 Simar sipare by baharul islam
 Uttaradhikar by Bhagirathi Bai Kadam
 Garh by baharul islam
 Miss Julie directed by baharul islam

Play design & direction 

 Ram Shyam Jadu playwright by Badal Sircar & translated by: Nayan Prasad
 Ankur playwright by AmulyaKakati
 Urukha playwright by Karuna Deka
 Abhimanyu playwright by Karuna Deka
 Sarishrip playwright by Karuna Deka
 Saraighat playwright by Karuna Deka
 Yayati playwright by Girish Karnad, translated by: Naren Hazarika
 Guwahati Guwahati playwright by Mahendra Borthakur
 Holi playwright by Mahesh Elkunchwar
 Patasara playwright by Novel: NabaKanta Baruah Dramatized by: KarunaDeka
 Anurati Maya (Hindi) playwright by Based on The Seagull, Anton Chekhov
 Who is Afraid of Virginia Wolf (Hindi) playwright by Edward Albee
 Bagia Bancharam (Hindi) playwright by Manoj Mitra
 Seagull (Kannada) playwright by Anton Chekhov
 Kit playwright by Dr. Shyama Prasad Sarma
 Baligharar Alahi playwright by Based on the play ‘ King Lear’ William Shakespeare  Translated by: MahendraBorthakur
 Hey Mahanagar playwright by Mahendra Borthakur
 Pabitra Paapi (Oedipus) playwright by Sophocles Translated by: Sewabrata Baruah
 Prem  ( ?) playwright by Mahendra Borthakur
 Gundaraj playwright by Champak Sarma
 Tajyaputra playwright by Mahesh Kalita
 Apekshya playwright by Novel: Mamani Raisom Gowamami Dramatized by:  Baharul Islam
 Jatra playwright by Story: Imram Hussain Dramatized by: Baharul Islam)
 Kashmeer Kumari playwright by Ganesh Gogoi
 Ujir Mangala (Puntila and his man Matti) playwright by Bertolt Brecth Adapted by Naren Patgiri
 Akash (Assamese/ Hindi) playwright by Dr, Bhabendranath Saikia, Baharul Islam
 Edal Seujia Saap playwright by Dr. BhrubaJyti Bora, Baharulislam
 Simar Sipare playwright by Baharul Islam
 Hatta Melar Sipare playwright by Badal sircar Translated by: Nayan Prasad 
 Seagull playwright by Anton Chekhov
 Hanseeni playwright by Novel: NabaKanta Baruah Dramatized by: KarunaDeka
 Five tons of Love playwright by Anton Chekhov
 Patasara playwright by Novel: NabaKanta Baruah Dramatized by: Karuna Deka
 Garh (The Rhinoceros) playwright by Eugene Ionesco Translated by: Karuna Deka
 Sri Nibaran Bhattacharya playwright by Arun Sarma
 Moi Premar Pinjarat Bandi playwright by Bipulananda Choudhury
 Miss Julie playwright by Augustus Strindberg Translated by: Baharul Islam
 Agni Aur Barkha playwright by Girish Karnad Translated by: Amulya kumar Jointly Directed by Baharul Islam & Bhagirathi
 Madhyabartini (Assamese/Hindi) playwright by Rabindranath Tagore dramatisation by: Naren Patgiri/ Baharul
 Court Marshal playwright by Swaraj Deepak Translated by: Nayan Prasad
 Pana Gaoar Tupat Enisha playwright by Baharul Islam
 Labhita playwright by Jyoti Prasad Agarwala
 Buddhuram playwright by B V Karanth Translation- Bhagirathi
 Charandas Chor playwright by Habib Tanvir Translated by: Anup Hazarika & Bhagirathi 
 Sikari playwright by Munin Barua
 The Nature playwright by based on an article
 The Customewalla playwright by baharul Islam
 Godzilla playwright by baharul islam
 Dhetteri (Bourgeois gentleman) playwright by Moliere 
 Modala gitti playwright by Baharul Islam
 Swabhavjata playwright by Baharul Islam

Filmography  
As an actor he acted in different Indian languages.

Assamese language 

 SURUJ - directed by Pulak Gogoi
 SANGKALPA-directed by Hem Bora
 BHAI BHAI -directed by Biju Phukan
 PITA PUTRA -directed by Munin Baruah
 NAYAK- directed by Munin Baruah
 BAROOD- directed by Munin Baruah
 DINOBANDHU -directed by Munin Baruah
 MOROM NODIR GABHORU GHAT- directed by Pulak Gogoi
 BAGH MANUHOR KHELA-
 RONGA MODAR- directed by Timothy Hanse
 ANTHEEN JATRA- directed by Munna Ahmed
 RAKTBEEZ - directed by Biswajit Bora
 EZAK JONAKIR JILMIL- directed by Biswajit Bora
 BAHNIMAAN- directed by Biswajit Bora
 PHEHUJALI - directed by Biswajit Bora
 ASENE KUNUBA HIYAT- directed by baharul islam
 AJANITE MONE MONE - directed by Upakul Bordoloi
 KANEEN - directed by Monjul Baruah
 GORU- directed by Himanshu Prasad das
 GHOST OF MAIKHULI- directed by Pankaj Soram
 CHANDU -directed by Asim Baishya
 ULKA - directed by Pranab Vivek
 APONJON - directed by Gauri Barman
 THE UNDERWORLD- directed by Rajesh Jaiswal
 SAAT NOMBOROR DUSHMON- directed by Abdul Majid
 BAIBHAV- directed by Manju Bora
 PRATYAHBAAN - directed by Nippon Dhulia
 SAMIRAN BARUAH AHI ASE -directed by Pradyut Deka
 JATINGA ITYADI -

SADRI language 

 Maya- directed by Rajesh Bhuyan and Pabitra Margherita

Bengali language 

 Alifa -directed by Deep Choudhury
 Five Days with A Terrorist- directed by Arijit Mukhopadhyay

Hindi language 

 Kaalsandhya  - directed by Bhabendra Nath Saikia
 Merit Animal - directed by Junaid Imam
 Dil Bechara- directed by Mukesh Chabbra
 Chapak - directed by Meghana Gulzar
 Maidan- directed Amit Sharma
 Pepper Chicken - directed by Ratan Sil Sarma
 Dhuwa se Dhuwa Taq(short feature) - directed by Biswajeet Bora 
 83 (film) - directed by Kabir Khan
 Bhediya - directed by Amar Kaushik

Kannada language 

 Hoomale - directed by Nagathihelli Chandrashekhar
 Kotta - directed by M S Satthyu

References

Citations 

National School of Drama alumni
Assamese actors
Living people
People from Goalpara district
21st-century Indian film directors
Male actors from Assam
21st-century Indian male actors
Year of birth missing (living people)